Jonatan or Jonathan Johansson is the name of:
Jonatan Johansson (footballer) (born 1975), Finnish football player and coach
Jonatan Johansson (snowboarder) (1980–2006), Swedish snowboarder 
Jonathan Johansson (musician) (born 1980), Swedish musician
Jonathan Johansson (ice hockey) (born 1991), Swedish ice hockey player